James Boice (born 1982) is an American fiction writer.

Life
He was born in Salinas, California, and raised in Northern Virginia.

He is the author of MVP, published by Scribner in 2007, the prologue of which debuted in Esquire in September 2006. His second novel, NoVA was published by Scribner in 2008. His third novel, The Good and the Ghastly, also published by Scribner, was released in 2011.

His work has also appeared in Fiction, McSweeney's, Salt Hill, and Like Water Burning. He has contributed to Esquire.

References

External links 

1982 births
Living people
21st-century American novelists
Writers from Boston
Novelists from Virginia
American male novelists
21st-century American male writers
Novelists from Massachusetts